Ki Geh (also Romanized as Kī Geh and Kigeh) is a village in Sardasht Rural District, Sardasht District, Dezful County, Khuzestan Province, Iran. At the 2006 census, its population was 22, in 4 families.

References 

Populated places in Dezful County